Guaicaro (Guaïcaro) is an extinct, unclassified language of Patagonia known only from a 19-word list and personal names.

The Guaicaro people apparently lived on the Brunswick Peninsula, bordering the Tehuelche to their northeast in around Laguna Blanca. 

The Guaicaros (also rendered Guaïkaros, Guaicurúes, Huacurúes) were apparently the same people known as the Huemules (Güemules) and Supalios.

Classification
It is only known from personal names and a list of 19 words elicited using gestures from the last documented speaker, a medicine man living among the Tehuelche, and published in 1896. Most of the words can be explained as Central Alacaluf or Tawókser (or both), though mer 'arm' appears to come from Chon.

Vocabulary
Word list of Guaicaro documented by Ramón Lista (1896):

{| class="wikitable sortable"
! Spanish gloss !! English gloss !! Guaicaro
|-
| fuego || fire || charcuish
|-
| viento || wind || lefeskar
|-
| nube || cloud || arkayeta
|-
| hombre || man || pellieri
|-
| mujer || woman || esnatun
|-
| ojos || eyes || têl ó téel
|-
| boca || mouth || asfjestail
|-
| nariz || nose || huicharek
|-
| cabeza || head || hurkúar
|-
| perro || dog || shalki
|-
| pescado || fish || yaulchel
|-
| leña || firewood || kekásh
|-
| mano  || hand || teregua
|-
| dedo || finger || fol karjk
|-
| brazo || arm || merr
|-
| dientes  || teeth || lefeskar
|-
| pelo || hair || tercóf
|-
| cantar || sing || lektan
|-
| llorar || cry || etkastal
|}

References

Extinct languages of South America
Unclassified languages of South America
Alacalufan languages
Languages attested from the 19th century
Languages extinct in the 20th century